The yellow-throated nicator (Nicator vireo) is a species of songbird in the family Nicatoridae.

Range and habitat
It is found in Angola, Cameroon, Central African Republic, Republic of the Congo, DRC, Equatorial Guinea, Gabon, and Uganda. Its natural habitat is subtropical or tropical moist lowland forests.

References

External links
Image at ADW

yellow-throated nicator
Birds of Central Africa
Birds described in 1876
Taxonomy articles created by Polbot